Your Heiress Diary: Confess It All to Me is a book by American television personality Paris Hilton released on November 11, 2005.

It was co-written by Merle Ginsberg.

References

Books by Paris Hilton
American autobiographies
2005 non-fiction books
Collaborative non-fiction books